The qualification for 2000 Men's Olympic Volleyball Tournament was held from 12 June 1999 to 27 July 2000.

Means of qualification

Host country
FIVB reserved a vacancy for the 2000 Summer Olympics host country to participate in the tournament.

1999 World Cup

Venues: 
Dates: 18 November – 2 December 1999
The top three teams qualified for the 2000 Summer Olympics.

Continental qualification tournaments
The winners in each tournament qualified for the 2000 Summer Olympics.

Africa
Host:  Cairo, Egypt
Dates: 25–30 January 2000

|}

|}

Asia and Oceania
Host:  Shanghai, China
Dates: 27–29 December 1999

|}

|}

Europe

Venue:  Spodek, Katowice, Poland
Dates: 3–9 January 2000

North America

Host:  Winnipeg, Canada
Dates: 5–8 January 2000

South America
Host:  São Caetano do Sul, Brazil
Dates: 7–9 January 2000
All times are Brasília Official Summer Time (UTC−02:00).

|}

|}

World qualification tournaments
The winners in each tournament qualified for the 2000 Summer Olympics.

1st tournament
Host:  Matosinhos, Portugal
Dates: 21–23 July 2000

|}

|}

2nd tournament
Host:  Piraeus, Greece
Dates: 24–26 July 2000

|}

|}

3rd tournament
Host:  Castelnau-le-Lez, France
Dates: 25–27 July 2000

|}

|}

External links
Results of the 2000 African Olympic Qualification Tournament at Todor66.com
Results of the 1999 Asian Olympic Qualification Tournament at Todor66.com
Official website of the 2000 European Olympic Qualification Tournament
Results of the 2000 North American Olympic Qualification Tournament at Todor66.com
Results of the 2000 South Olympic American Qualification Tournament at Todor66.com
Results of the 2000 World Olympic Qualification Tournaments at Todor66.com

M
Olympic Qualification Men
2000